Cinte Tesino (Sinte, Zinte, Thinte or Finte in local dialect) is a comune (municipality) in Trentino in the northern Italian region Trentino-Alto Adige/Südtirol, located about  east of Trento.

Cinte Tesino borders the following municipalities: Canal San Bovo, Pieve Tesino, Castello Tesino, Scurelle, Lamon, Ospedaletto, and Grigno.

Demographic evolution

References

Cities and towns in Trentino-Alto Adige/Südtirol